3-Methyl-2-butanol (IUPAC name, commonly called sec-isoamyl alcohol) is an organic chemical compound. It is used as a solvent and an intermediate in the manufacture of other chemicals.

References

Alcohol solvents
Alkanols
Secondary alcohols